Zuckerman Unbound is a 1981 novel by the American author Philip Roth.

Nathan Zuckerman
The novel resumes the story of Roth's fictional alter ego Nathan Zuckerman that was inaugurated by Roth's previous novel The Ghost Writer.

Themes
Like much of Roth's fiction, Zuckerman Unbound confronts the tenuous relationship between an author and his creations.

Quiz show scandals
The novel—through its supporting cast—explores the quiz show scandals of the 1950s, which also form the basis for Robert Redford's 1994 drama Quiz Show. In Roth's novel, Herb Stempel and Charles Van Doren—played in the Redford film by, respectively, John Turturro and Ralph Fiennes—are called Alvin Pepler and Hewlett Lincoln.

Plot summary

The novel parallels several real events in Roth's life, including the publication of his 1969 novel Portnoy's Complaint and the hoopla which surrounded Roth in the wake of that novel's fame. By analogy, in Zuckerman Unbound, Zuckerman has achieved meteoric acclaim and notoriety with Carnovsky, a coming-of-age sex romp that differs remarkably from Zuckerman's previously Jamesian fiction. The extent to which the details of the Zuckerman character can be safely compared to those of Roth has been a subject of zealous debate among Roth's readers. Roth himself has weighed in on the debate, both in interviews and within his fiction.

Zuckerman Bound
The first and last books in the initial Zuckerman trilogy are 1979's The Ghost Writer and 1983's The Anatomy Lesson. The three were collected and republished in 1985 as Zuckerman Bound.

Critical reception
Critic John Lahr,  in New York Magazine, called the novel "fascinating." In The New Yorker, John Updike remarked, "Always one of the most intelligent and energetic of American writers, he has now become one of the most scrupulous." In Time, R. Z. Sheppard praised Roth's "comic genius."  In The New York Times Book Review, critic Harold Bloom said of the three collected Zuckerman novels, "Zuckerman Bound merits something reasonably close to the highest level of esthetic praise for tragicomedy."

See also
 Quiz show scandals
 Quiz Show (1994)
 Herb Stempel
 Zuckerman Bound

External links
 Harold Bloom on Zuckerman Bound

References

1981 American novels
Novels by Philip Roth
Farrar, Straus and Giroux books